Canada – Grenada relations are bilateral relations between Canada and Grenada. Canada recognized Grenada and also formally established diplomatic relations on 7 February 1974, as the same day as Grenada got independence from the United Kingdom of Great Britain and Northern Ireland.
Both countries are members of the Commonwealth of Nations, and they share the same head of state and monarch as Commonwealth realms.

History
Early bilateral interactions occurred as both countries shared their colonial relationship as former parts of the British Empire.

Trade
There are eight Canadian businesses in Grenada.

As today,  Canadian banks have an especially large role in the Grenada commercial banking industry. Canadian banks own one of the largest banks in Grenada.
In the early 1980s, the Canadian government contributed six million US dollar for the contraction of the Point Salines International, as today known as the Maurice Bishop International Airport.

Canadian Business companies in Grenada

 First Caribbean International Bank
 Scotia Bank 

 Royal Bank of Canada

Diplomacy
All officials are located at the Canadian High Commission in Bridgetown, Barbados. Grenada has a consulate general in Toronto, Ontario, Canada.

Bilateral agreements

References

 
Grenada
Bilateral relations of Grenada
Grenada
Grenada and the Commonwealth of Nations